Ficus religiosa or sacred fig is a species of fig native to the Indian subcontinent and Indochina that belongs to Moraceae, the fig or mulberry family. It is also known as the bodhi tree, pippala tree, peepul tree, peepal tree, pipal tree, ashvattha tree (in India and Nepal), or Asathu (ඇසතු) in Sinhala  The sacred fig is considered to have a religious significance in three major religions that originated on the Indian subcontinent, Hinduism, Buddhism and Jainism. Hindu and Jain ascetics consider the species to be sacred and often meditate under it. This is the tree species under which Gautama Buddha is believed to have attained enlightenment. The sacred fig is the state tree of the Indian states of Odisha, Bihar and Haryana.

Description

The fruits are small figs  in diameter, green ripening to purple.

F. religiosa has a lifespan ranging between 900 and 1,500 years. The Jaya Sri Maha Bodhi tree in the city of Anuradhapura in Sri Lanka is estimated to be more than 2,250 years old.

Distribution
Ficus religiosa is native to most of the Indian subcontinent – Bangladesh, Bhutan, Nepal, Pakistan and India including the Assam region, Eastern Himalaya and the Nicobar Islands, as well as part of Indochina – the Andaman Islands, Thailand, Myanmar and Peninsular Malaysia. It has been widely introduced elsewhere, particularly in the rest of tropical Asia, but also in Iran, Florida and Venezuela.

Ecology

It grows on a wide variety of soils but preferably needs deep, alluvial sandy loam with good drainage. It is also found on shallow soils including rock crevices.

Association
Ficus religiosa is associated with Blastophaga quadriceps, an agaonid wasp which acts as its pollinator as this wasp lays its eggs only on trees of this species.

Environment
Ficus religiosa is tolerant to various climate zones (Köppen climate classification categories of Af, Am, Aw/As, Cfa, Cwa and Csa) and various types of soils.

Climate

Invasiveness

Unlike most epiphytic jungle figs, which ring the stems of dicotyledonous support trees from the outside, the epiphytic bushes of F. religiosa are not true stranglers. Their roots penetrate inside the stem of the support, eventually splitting it from within. Ficus religiosa has been listed as an "environmental weed" or "naturalised weed" by the Global Compendium of Weeds (Randall, 2012). It has been assigned an invasiveness high risk score of 7 in a risk assessment prepared for the species' invasiveness in Hawaii by PIER. Such a high score predicts it will become a major pest in suitable climate zones. The major reasons for its invasive behaviour are its fast-growing nature, tolerance to various climate zones and soil types, reported lifespan of over 3,000 years, and its suffocating growth habit as it often begins life as an epiphyte.

In heritage

The earliest known record of Ficus religiosa in human culture is the use of peepal leaf motifs in the pottery of the Helmand culture, found at Mundigak site, in Kandahar, Afghanistan, dating back to third millennium BCE.

The peepal tree is considered sacred by the followers of Hinduism, Jainism and Buddhism. In the Bhagavad Gita, Krishna says, "I am the Peepal tree among the trees, Narada among the Deva Rishi (Divine sages), Bhrigu among the Saptha-Maharishis, Chitraratha among the Gandharvas, And sage Kapila among the Siddhas." In India, the medal for the highest civilian award, Bharat Ratna, is modelled on the leaf of a Peepal tree.

Buddhism

Gautama Buddha attained enlightenment (bodhi) while meditating underneath a Ficus religiosa. The site is in present-day Bodh Gaya in Bihar, India. The original tree was destroyed, and has been replaced several times. A branch of the original tree was rooted in Anuradhapura, Sri Lanka in 288 BCE and is known as Jaya Sri Maha Bodhi; it is the oldest living human-planted flowering plant (angiosperm) in the world.

In Theravada Buddhist Southeast Asia, the tree's massive trunk is often the site of Buddhist or animist shrines. Not all Ficus religiosa are ordinarily called a Bodhi Tree. A true Bodhi Tree is traditionally considered a tree that has as its parent another Bodhi Tree, and so on, until the first Bodhi Tree, which is the tree under which Gautama is said to have gained enlightenment.

Hinduism
Sadhus (Hindu ascetics) meditate beneath sacred fig trees, and Hindus do pradakshina (circumambulation, or meditative pacing) around the sacred fig tree as a mark of worship. Usually seven pradakshinas are done around the tree in the morning time chanting "vriksha rajaya namah", meaning "salutation to the king of trees". It is claimed that the 27 stars (constellations) constituting 12 houses (rasis) and 9 planets are specifically represented precisely by 27 trees—one for each star. The Bodhi Tree is said to represent Pushya (Western star name γ, δ and θ Cancri in the Cancer constellation).

Plaksa is a possible Sanskrit term for Ficus religiosa. However, according to Macdonell and Keith (1912), it denotes the wavy-leaved fig tree (Ficus infectoria) instead. In Hindu texts, the Plaksa tree is associated with the source of the Sarasvati River. The Skanda Purana states that the Sarasvati originates from the water pot of Brahma  flows from Plaksa on the Himalayas. According to Vamana Purana 32.1-4, the Sarasvati was rising from the Plaksa tree (Pipal tree). Plaksa Pra-sravana denotes the place where the Sarasvati appears. In the Rigveda Sutras, Plaksa Pra-sravana refers to the source of the Sarasvati.

Cultivation

Ficus religiosa is grown by specialty tree plant nurseries for use as an ornamental tree, in gardens and parks in tropical and subtropical climates. Peepul trees are native to Indian subcontinent and thrive in hot, humid weather. They prefer full sunlight and can grow in all soil types, though loam is the best. When planting, use soil with a pH of 7 or below. While it is possible for the plant to grow indoors in a pot, it grows best outside. Young peepul needs proper nourishment. It requires full sunlight and proper watering. Sacred fig occurs naturally in submontane forest regions. As with many Ficus trees, these are well suited for Bonsai training.

In the Middle East, it is preferably planted as an avenue or road verge tree. In the Philippines and in Nicaragua the species is cultivated in parks and along roadsides and pavements, while in Paraguay it occurs in forests at lower elevations.

As with all sacred trees in Thailand, they have a saffron cloth wrapped around the base. A yearly ritual involving the Bo Trees at wats is the purchasing of "mai kam sii" ไม้คำ้ศริ, which are "supports" that look like crutches and are placed under the spreading branches as if holding them up. The purchase money helps fund the wat, a central part of Thai life.

Uses
Ficus religiosa is used in traditional medicine for about fifty types of disorders including asthma, diabetes, diarrhea, epilepsy, gastric problems, inflammatory disorders, infectious and sexual disorders.

Farmers in North India also cultivate it for its fig fruit.

The trunk of this tree is used by farmers as a soil leveller. After seed harvesting, the rectangular trunk is connected to tractors and levels the soil.

See also
 Bodhi Tree
 Shitala Devi
 Ficus Ruminalis

Notes

References
 Keith and Macdonell. 1912. Vedic Index of Names and Subjects.
 Plaksa description

External links

 
 
The Bodhi tree revealed by old picture

religiosa
Trees in religion
Sacred trees in Hinduism
Trees of the Indian subcontinent
Trees of Indo-China
Plants described in 1753
Plants used in traditional Chinese medicine
Epiphytes
Garden plants of Asia
Ornamental trees
Taxa named by Carl Linnaeus
Symbols of Bihar
Symbols of Haryana